Elliot Easton (born Elliot Steinberg, December 18, 1953) is an American guitarist. He played lead guitar and sang backing vocals for The Cars, and his guitar solos are an integral part of the band's music. Easton has also recorded music as a solo artist, and has played in other bands. He is a left-handed guitarist. In 2018, Easton was inducted into the Rock and Roll Hall of Fame as a member of the Cars.

Career 
Easton studied music at the Berklee College of Music.

Easton is a founding member of The Cars and was its lead guitarist. The band was formed in 1976. Its debut album, The Cars (1978), contained the hit single "Just What I Needed". The band went on to release five more albums over the next nine years before breaking up in 1988. Easton was the youngest member of the band.

Easton released one solo album, Change No Change (1985), featuring songs co-written with Jules Shear. One single, "(Wearing Down) Like a Wheel", was released and became a moderate hit on the rock charts.

In the mid-1990s, Easton produced and played on the first two albums by Amy Rigby.  He was also the lead guitarist on Jules Shear's 1994 album 'Healing Bones'.

Easton then joined Creedence Clearwater Revisited.

Easton was a member of The New Cars, along with original Cars keyboardist Greg Hawkes, singer/songwriter Todd Rundgren, former Utopia bassist/vocalist Kasim Sulton, and Tubes drummer Prairie Prince. In June 2006, the band released a live album, It's Alive!, that includes three new studio tracks.

Easton was featured and played the solo in the Click Five song "Angel to You (Devil to Me)".

In 2010, Easton reunited with the surviving original members of The Cars to record their first album in 24 years, entitled Move Like This. The album was released in 2011, and the band toured in support of it.

Easton next became a founding member of The Empty Hearts supergroup formed in 2014. The band also included The Chesterfield Kings bassist Andy Babiuk, Blondie drummer Clem Burke, The Romantics guitarist and vocalist Wally Palmar, and Faces pianist Ian McLagan.

Guns N' Roses and Velvet Revolver guitarist Slash has cited Easton as one of his musical influences, praising Easton's concise and melodic solos.

In 2018, Easton was inducted into the Rock and Roll Hall of Fame as a member of the Cars.

Gibson Guitars Signature Model 

In 2013, the Gibson Guitar Company launched the Elliot Easton "Tikibird" Firebird guitar, which is a modified version of their Firebird model.

Personal life 
Easton has been married twice. As of 2018, he is married to Jill Easton. He has a daughter, Sydney, from his first marriage. He lives in Bell Canyon, California.

Discography

Studio albums 
Change No Change (1985) – US #99

With the Cars 
The Cars (1978)
Candy-O (1979)
Panorama (1980)
Shake It Up (1981)
Heartbeat City (1984)
Door to Door (1987)
Move Like This (2011)

With Benjamin Orr 
The Lace (1986)

With Elliot Easton's Tiki Gods 
Easton Island (2013)

Singles 
"(Wearing Down) Like a Wheel" (1985)
"Shayla" (1985)
"Tools of Your Labor" (1985)
"Monte Carlo Nights" with Elliot Easton's Tiki Gods (1995)

References

External links 

Elliott Easton Interview NAMM Oral History Library (2016)

The Cars members
The New Cars members
Creedence Clearwater Revisited members
American new wave musicians
American rock guitarists
American male guitarists
Lead guitarists
Musicians from Brooklyn
1953 births
Living people
People from Bell Canyon, California
Guitarists from New York (state)
20th-century American guitarists